Brown Brothers Harriman & Co. (BBH) is the oldest and one of the largest private investment banks in the United States. In 1931, the merger of Brown Brothers & Co. (founded in 1818) and Harriman Brothers & Co. formed the current BBH.

Brown Brothers Harriman is also notable for the number of influential American politicians, government appointees, and Cabinet members who have worked at the company, such as W. Averell Harriman, Prescott Bush, Robert A. Lovett, Richard W. Fisher, Robert Roosa, and Alan Greenspan.

Overview 
Brown Brothers Harriman provides advisory, wealth management, commercial banking, and investor services for corporate institutions and high-net-worth individual clients. Alongside the aforementioned services, the firm provides global custody, foreign exchange, private equity, merger and acquisitions, investment management for individuals and institutions, personal trust and estate administration, and securities brokerage services.  Organized as a partnership, BBH has approximately 6,000 staff in 18 offices throughout North America, Europe, and Asia. Currently, the firm has 38 partners, and acts as custodian and administrator for $3.3 trillion and $1.2 trillion in assets, respectively.

History

After immigrating to Baltimore in 1800 and building a successful linen mercantile trading business, Alexander Brown and his four sons co-founded Alex. Brown & Sons. In 1818, one son, John Alexander Brown, traveled to Philadelphia to establish John A. Brown and Co. In 1825, another son, James Brown, established Brown Brothers & Co. on Pine Street in Lower Manhattan and relocated to Wall Street in 1833. This firm eventually acquired all other Brown branches in the U.S. Another son, William Brown, had established William Brown & Co. in England in 1810, which was renamed Brown, Shipley & Co. in 1839 and became a separate entity in 1918.

Following the panic of 1837, Brown Brothers withdrew from most of its lending business. Two of the brothers, John and George, sold their shares in the company to the other two brothers, William and James. During the recovery from this economic turmoil, they chose to focus solely on currency exchange and international trade.

Merger

On January 2, 1931, Brown Brothers & Co. merged with two other business entities, Harriman Brothers & Company, a private bank started with railway money, and W. A. Harriman & Co. to form Brown Brothers Harriman & Co. Founding partners included:

Time December 22, 1930, issue announced that the three-way merger featured 11 Yale graduates among 16 founding partners. Eight of the partners listed above, except for Moreau Delano and Thatcher Brown, were Skull and Bones members.

In 1930s the company acted as a U.S. base for the German industrialist Fritz Thyssen, who helped finance Adolf Hitler.

After the passage of the Glass-Steagall Act, the partners decided to focus on commercial banking, becoming a private bank, and to spin its securities marketing and underwriting off into Harriman, Ripley and Company which eventually evolved into Drexel Burnham Lambert via mergers.

Harriman, a partner in the firm, was the ambassador and statesman responsible for the relationship between Winston Churchill and Franklin Roosevelt during World War II. Some historical records of Brown Brothers Harriman and its precursor companies are housed in the manuscript collections at the New-York Historical Society.

See also

 Alex. Brown & Sons Building
 Bankers Trust
 Brown Memorial Presbyterian Church

References

Further reading
 Karabell, Zachary (2021) Inside Money: Brown Brothers Harriman and the American Way of Power excerpt
 Karabell, Zachary (May 14, 2021). "The Capitalist Culture That Built America: Since the early 19th century, the firm of Brown Brothers defined the distinctive American mix of financial power and public service. Its example can still instruct us." The Wall Street Journal.
 Kouwenhoven, John Atlee (1968). Partners in Banking: An Historical Portrait of a Great Private Bank, Brown Brothers Harriman & Co., 1818-1968.

External links
 
 The Records of Brown Brothers Harriman 1696 -1973, 1995 at the New York Historical Society

 
Investment banks in the United States
Private banks
Banks based in New York City
American companies established in 1931
Banks established in 1931
Financial services companies established in 1931
1931 establishments in New York (state)
Privately held companies based in New York City